The Battle of the Campobasso Convoy was a naval engagement between three British Royal Navy destroyers and an Italian  torpedo boat which took place off Cape Bon in the Mediterranean sea on the night of 3/4 May 1943. The Italians were escorting the 3,566 gross register ton (GRT) freighter Campobasso to Tunisia.

Background
On the night of 29/30 April, the destroyers made a sweep along the south coast of Sicily and encountered the merchant ship Fauna (575 gross register tons (GRT) escorted by German E-boats. The British destroyers sank Fauna without loss.

Prelude
The Italian merchant ship Campobasso (3,566 GRT) had left Pantelleria island at 19:00 on 3 May, loaded with bombs, land-mines, motor transport and other supplies to the Axis forces in Tunisia. The merchant ship was joined by its escort, the  commanded by Saverio Marotta soon after departure.

The two ships undertook a winding course through the Axis and Allied minefields. On the night of 3/4 May off Kelibia on the Cap Bon peninsula, the British destroyers picked up radar contacts of vessels heading towards the Tunisian coast.

Action
After the action a crewman on Perseo wrote

Perseo launched its two starboard torpedoes from  then sailed at full speed to the north-west towards Cape Bon. Campobasso exploded at 23:48 illuminating Perseo. The British ships fired more star shell and Perseo began abrupt evasive action until 23:52 when its rudder suffered a mechanical fault. Before the crew could steer manually the hull was hit by two shells then more shells hit the bridge and the engine rooms. Steam escaped from the hull and covered the deck as the engines stopped operating. Perseo remained afloat for about an hour, when the magazine exploded and the ship sank by the stern at 01:00. The next day the Italian hospital ship Principessa Giovanna picked up four survivors from Campobasso (twenty men reached the coast in a lifeboat) and  Perseo. On 6 May the hospital ship was bombed and damaged by Allied aircraft, with  killed and

Aftermath

Casualties

Subsequent operations
A second convoy, led by the Ciclone-class torpedo boat , loaded with aviation spirit, escorted the merchant ship Belluno to Tunis from Trapani and managed to evade the British destroyers, after witnessing the destruction of Campobasso. The Tifone convoy arrived on 4 May and was the last Axis supply run to reach Africa during the war. Another Italian convoy composed by the Italian lighter MZ 724 and the water supply ship Scrivia sailed on 4 May and evacuated 200 Italian troops from Bizerte, reaching Cagliari undetected the following day.

Operation Retribution

As Axis airfields in Tunisia were captured, Allied fighters could escort Allied ships in the seas between Tunisia and Sicily, making day patrols feasible. Allied convoys along the coast and to Malta were stopped to divert their escorts to the blockade of Tunisia. Aircraft were to attack Axis ships within  of the Tunisian shore and beyond the limit, Allied ships would have freedom of movement. British mines had been timed to sink in early May and intelligence on Axis minefields was judged sufficient to risk sailing in some areas. British Motor Gun Boats, Motor Torpedo Boats and US PT boats patrolled closer inshore at night. Allied superiority was so great that  decided that an evacuation attempt would be futile. Sporadic attempts were made to flee Tunisia; after 7 May, the German KT 22, some Axis torpedo boats and MAS boats were the only vessels to run the blockade. By the Axis surrender, the blockading vessels had taken

Notes

Footnotes

References

Further reading
 
 
 
 
 

Allied naval victories in the battle of the Mediterranean
1943 in Italy
Naval battles of World War II involving Italy
Campobasso
Conflicts in 1943
Mediterranean convoys of World War II
May 1943 events